Mentoring Artists for Women's Art (MAWA) is a feminist visual arts education center based in Winnipeg, Manitoba. Created in 1984, this non-profit organization encourages and supports the intellectual and creative development of women in the visual arts by providing an ongoing forum for education and critical dialogue.

Monthly MAWA programming includes lectures, artist talks, skills based workshops, professional practices workshops, critical reading groups, studio visits, an artist-mothers group, screenings and field trips. Visiting artists and curators have included Lucy Lippard (Albuquerque, New Mexico), Deborah Kelly (Sydney, Australia), Sara Riel (Reykjavik, Iceland), Rosalie Favell (Ottawa), Allyson Mitchell (Toronto), Yolanda Paulsen (Mexico City) and Huma Mulji (Lahore, Pakistan). MAWA provides a platform for critical writing as well, by commissioning text that appears in their newsletter and on their website.

Although MAWA's mentorship programs are for women-identifying artists, recognizing historical and present-day inequalities, the majority of their programs are open to people of all genders, and are offered at low or no cost. MAWA has over 300 paid members, of whom approximately 80% reside in Winnipeg. An additional 10% are located throughout Manitoba and an additional 10% throughout the rest of Canada. Well over 350 volunteers contribute to MAWA each year.

History 
MAWA was founded as the Manitoba Artists for Women's Art.  It was initiated by School of Art professor Diane Whitehouse, who was also on the Board of Plug In Gallery. She gathered together a working group including Sheila Butler, fine art students and others. They collaborated to create an organisation that addresses gender inequality in the visual arts by giving opportunities to women. It was created in response to the findings of a research committee based at Plug In Institute of Contemporary Art.

Mentorship 
MAWA works to sustain art in the community through mentorship programs. Senior women artists share their experience and expertise with developing women artists in a peer-support learning environment that empowers them to build their studio and/or curatorial practices. Through mentorship, MAWA has created a vibrant, skilled community, serving women artists in all phases of their careers.

Foundation Mentorship Program 
The Foundation Mentorship Program has been MAWA’s core activity since 1985. It is a year-long program. It is designed to help women in the visual arts develop skills and define their decision-making philosophies, and to provide access to the information, resources and support they need to realize their artistic goals. In addition to a one-on-one relationship with a mentor, the program provides peer support for the mentees through group mentorship meetings.

Mentors and Mentees 
Mentors have included Sheila Butler, Aganetha Dyck,  Diana Thorneycroft, Eleanor Bond, Bev Pike, Grace Nickel, Sigrid Dahle, Shawna Dempsey, KC Adams, and many more. Former mentees have included Reva Stone, Laura Letinsky, Roewan Crowe and Dominique Rey among others.

Exhibitions 
Grrls, Chicks, Sisters & Squaws: Les citoyennes du cyberspace (2006). Curated by Skawennati Tricia Fragnito.

Resilience (2018). Curated by Lee-Ann Martin.

Publications 
 Culture of Community (2004)
 Technologies of Intuition (2006)
 Desire Change: Contemporary Feminist Art in Canada (2017)

References

External links
Official website
Why Women?

Canadian artist groups and collectives
Artist-run centres
Women in Manitoba
1984 establishments in Manitoba
1984 in art